Greenhow is a surname. Notable people with the surname include:

Edward Headlam Greenhow (1814–1888), British physician
Frances Lupton (née Greenhow; 1821–1892), English advocate for female education reform
Rose O'Neal Greenhow (1813/1814–1864), American Civil War Confederate spy
Thomas Michael Greenhow (1792–1881), English physician